The Women's Macau Open 2015 is the women's edition of the 2015 Macau Open, which is a tournament of the PSA World Tour event International (prize money: $50,000). The event took place in Macau, China from 17 September to 20 September. Laura Massaro won her first Macau Open trophy, beating Nouran Gohar in the final.

Prize money and ranking points
For 2015, the prize purse was $50,000. The prize money and points breakdown was as follows:

Seeds

Draw and results

See also
2015 PSA World Tour
Men's Macau Open 2015
Macau Open

References

External links
PSA Macau Open 2015 website
Macau Open 2015 squashsite page

Squash tournaments in Macau
Macau Open
Macau Open (squash)
2015 in women's squash
Women's sport in Macau